The , also known as the ,  , and Imperial Rescript Denying His Divinity, is an imperial rescript issued by the Emperor Shōwa as part of a New Year's statement on 1 January 1946 at the request of the Supreme Commander of the Allied Powers (also known as General Headquarters, abbreviated as GHQ). In the rescript, which started with his citation of  the Five Charter Oath of 1868, the Emperor denied the concept of his divinity, which would eventually lead to the promulgation of the new Constitution, under which the Emperor is "the symbol of the State and of the unity of the people".

The Declaration
Delivery of this rescript was to be one of the Emperor's last acts as the imperial Sovereign. The Supreme Commander Allied Powers and the Western world in general gave great attention to the following passage towards the end of the rescript:

Dower, John W. 
This first draft of this rescript is said to have been drafted by Japanese cultural scholars Reginald Horace Blyth and Harold Gould Henderson, who also contributed to the popularisation of Zen and the poetic form of haiku outside Japan.

Ben-Ami Shillony 
Ben-Ami Shillony (Professor emeritus of Japanese history, Hebrew University of Jerusalem)

The "Human Declaration" has only a few lines in the last paragraph, which is only one sixth of the rescript. The few lines only confirm the facts and do not give up anything in particular.

The "Human Declaration" does not deny that "the ancestors of the emperor are the gods of Japanese mythology". The deity of successive emperors is not denied. Nor did it abolish the sacred rituals performed by the emperors for the worship of mythical gods and successive emperors.

Interpretation
The exact meaning of the text, which was published in archaic Japanese, has been the subject of considerable debate. In particular, in the passage of the declaration which was officially translated as "false conception according to which the emperor is divine", the unusual term  was used instead of the more common word   means "exist" or "appear",  means "person" and  means "god".

Western view
According to the popular Western view, promoted by the Supreme Commander of the Allied Powers, the rescript challenged the centuries-old claim that the Japanese emperor and his predecessors were descendants of the sun goddess Amaterasu, and thus the Emperor had now publicly admitted that he was not a living god. Thus, the same day as the rescript was issued, General Douglas MacArthur announced that he was very much pleased with the Emperor's statement, which he saw as his commitment to lead his people in the democratisation of Japan.

In fact, Jean Herbert explains that, according to the Japanese tradition, the figure of the emperor would be "the extension in time" of the goddess Amaterasu and the previous emperors, representing a privileged moment in eternity. Consequently, it would be inadmissible to deny its divine origin."

Japanese view

On 1 January 1946, the rescript was reported on the front page of each newspaper. The  said, "Give me a rescript for the New Year. The ties are with trust and respect, my heart, and the people." The headlines of the newspaper did not mention the deity, but only reported that Japan's peace and the emperor were with the people. The emperor's denial of deity had no news value at all.

Critics of the Western interpretation, including Emperor Shōwa himself, argue that the repudiation of divinity was not the point of the rescript. Some argue that since this rescript starts with a full quote from the Five Charter Oath of 1868 by Emperor Meiji, the Emperor's true intention was that Japan had already been democratic since the Meiji Era and was not democratized by the occupiers. As was clarified at a press interview of 23 August 1977, the Emperor wanted the Japanese people not to forget pride in Japan. This interpretation is supported by the fact that the imperial rescript was published with a commentary by Prime Minister Kijūrō Shidehara that dwelt exclusively on the prior existence of democracy in the Meiji Era and did not make even passing reference to the emperor's "renunciation of divinity".

Emperor Shōwa was persistent in the idea that the emperor of Japan should be considered a descendant of the gods. In December 1945, he told his vice-grand chamberlain Michio Kinoshita: "It is permissible to say that the idea that the Japanese are descendants of the gods is a false conception; but it is absolutely impermissible to call chimerical the idea that the emperor is a descendant of the gods." Shinto officials and right wing groups throughout Japan today do not recognize the declaration as admitting that the emperor and country are not divine. 

Osamu Watanabe sent the following comments to the newspaper:

The Minister of Education, Culture, Sports, Science and Technology, Maeda Tamon, along with Gakushuin University director Katsunoshin Yamanashi and Prime Minister Kijuro Shidehara, are key figures in Japan who have read and examined the draft of the Human Declaration. He was also a Quaker and, like many Japanese Christians, revered the emperor. In December 1945, he answered in a question and answer session of the Imperial Diet that "the emperor is a god". "It is not a god of Western concept, but 'in the sense that it is the highest level in the world in the traditional Japanese concept' is a god", he replied.

See also
 Occupation of Japan
 World War II
 State Shinto

Notes

References
 Dower, John W. (1999). Embracing Defeat: Japan in the Wake of World War II. New York: W. W. Norton. ; 
 ベン・アミー・シロニー(著) Ben-Ami Shillony(原著)『母なる天皇―女性的君主制の過去・現在・未来』大谷堅志郎 (翻訳)、講談社 (2003/1/1). .

External links
 Full text of the rescript (in Japanese and English, not official)
 Full text (official in Japanese)
 Original Document (National Archives of Japan)

1946 in Japan
Japanese monarchy
Occupied Japan
Rescripts
Hirohito
Shinto in Japan
1946 documents
Japanese Imperial rescripts
1946 in Japanese politics
Japanese imperial history